is a free-to-play mobile game developed by Hit-Point Co.,Ltd  that operates in Nagoya, Kyoto, released on 24 November 2017 for iOS and Android devices.

Similar to the mobile game Neko Atsume developed by the same company, Travel Frog is a low-pressure, non-competitive game with carefully designed graphics. The only thing players have control over in the game is the preparation work of the frog's travel. The frog spends time at home studying and playing, and when it decides to travel, it can be away for up to four days, during which time the players would not have chance to interact with the frog.

Performance on Chinese market 
Travel Frog has remained No.1  in the free game category on the Chinese app store  for more than two weeks in January, 2018, by which time the Chinese translation was not even available yet and the game was presented in Japanese.

On April 2, 2018, Alibaba Group announced that it had cooperated with Hit-Point Co.,Ltd and obtained an authorized agent to issue the official Chinese version of "Traveling Frog", and will launch Chinese-style game content. The Chinese version of the frog eating steamed buns is going online.

See also
Neko Atsume

References

External links

2017 video games
Android (operating system) games
IOS games
Video games about amphibians
Video games developed in Japan
Virtual pet video games